Christopher Sean George (born September 24, 1966) is a former Major League Baseball pitcher who played two games with the Milwaukee Brewers in .

George was selected as a 1990 California League All-Star and won the 1990 minor league player of the year Ray Scarborough Award. The following season he was selected to be a Texas League All-Star and was ranked by Baseball America as the number one prospect in the Milwaukee Brewers farm system.  

During his minor league career he converted all 45 of his save opportunities.

George's Major League debut took place on October 1st, 1991 against the Cleveland Indians where he was the starting pitcher in the second game of a doubleheader. He would pitch 5 innings and receive a no-decision in a 6-2 Brewers defeat. Four days later George would make his second and final appearance in the Majors as he pitched the final inning of a 13-4 Brewers win in Boston against the Red Sox; he ended the game by striking out Mike Brumley.

References

External links

1966 births
Living people
Major League Baseball pitchers
Baseball players from Pittsburgh
Milwaukee Brewers players
Kent State Golden Flashes baseball players
Beloit Brewers players
Denver Zephyrs players
El Paso Diablos players
Mat-Su Miners players
New Orleans Zephyrs players
Stockton Ports players